Bezlesnaya is a rural locality (a settlement) in Kovarditskoye Rural Settlement, Muromsky District, Vladimir Oblast, Russia. The population was 13 as of 2010.

Geography 
The village is located 22 km north-west from Kovarditsy, 28 km north-west from Murom.

References 

Rural localities in Muromsky District
Muromsky Uyezd